Latife Uşaklıgil (born Fatıma-tüz Zehra Latife Uşakîzâde; with the honorifics, Latife Hanım) (17 June 1898 – 12 July 1975) was Mustafa Kemal's (later Atatürk) wife between 1923 and 1925. She was related from her father's side to Turkish novelist Halid Ziya Uşaklıgil.

Biography 

Lâtife Hanım was born in 1898 in Smyrna (now known in English as İzmir) to one of the most prominent trading families of the city, with roots in the city of Uşak, whence their unofficial family name of Uşakizâde. She completed her high school studies in Smyrna and in 1919 she went abroad to study Law in Paris and London. When she came back to Turkey, the Turkish War of Independence was nearing its end.

On 11 September 1922, upon returning to her family mansion in Smyrna, she was confronted by soldiers who notified her that the Pasha had taken the house as General Headquarters in Smyrna. After convincing the soldiers that she actually belonged to the household, she was allowed in.

Lâtife Hanım and Mustafa Kemal Pasha married on 29 January 1923 when he had returned to Smyrna just after his mother Zübeyde Hanım's death. For two and a half years, Lâtife Hanım symbolized the new face of Turkish women as a first lady who was very present in public life which, in Turkey, was a novelty by the standards of her day. She had a significant influence on the reforms which began in Turkey in the 1920s for the emancipation of women.

However, the relationship between her and her husband was not happy; after frequent arguments, the two were divorced on 5 August 1925. Lâtife Hanım lived the rest of her days in Izmir (as Smyrna came to be known in English after the 1930s) and İstanbul (known as Constantinople in English prior to the 1930s), in virtual seclusion, avoiding contacts outside her private circle until her death in 1975. She never remarried, and remained silent about their relationship throughout her life. In 2005, the Turkish Historical Society was to make her diaries public "except for the most private ones, taking the views of her family into consideration". However, her family publicly claimed that they had the right to the ownership of the letters and stated that they did not wish the diaries to be published. Consequently, the society decided against the publication.

A comprehensive but also controversial biography of Latife Hanım by the veteran Cumhuriyet journalist İpek Çalışlar was published in 2006.

Gallery

References

 

1898 births
1975 deaths
People from İzmir
Mustafa Kemal Atatürk
First Ladies of Turkey
20th-century people from the Ottoman Empire
Turks from the Ottoman Empire
Deaths from cancer in Turkey
Deaths from breast cancer